Richard Varga (born 28 January 1989) is a Slovak triathlete. He is the winner of the 2010, 2012, 2013, and 2015 ITU Aquathlon World Championship  and is considered as the fastest swimmer among triathletes.

Varga represented Slovakia at the 2012 Summer Olympics in men's triathlon. He had the fastest swim split of the event before ultimately finishing in 22nd place.

He represented Slovakia at the 2016 Summer Olympics as well, where he had the fastest swim split like in London and was able to ride along the leading pack on bike, but finally finished in 11th place.

References

External links 
 
 Richard Varga at the Slovenský Olympijský Výbor 

1989 births
Living people
Slovak male triathletes
Triathletes at the 2012 Summer Olympics
Olympic triathletes of Slovakia
European Games competitors for Slovakia
Triathletes at the 2015 European Games
Triathletes at the 2016 Summer Olympics
Sportspeople from Bratislava
20th-century Slovak people
21st-century Slovak people